The 2008 ARAG World Team Cup was a tennis tournament play on outdoor clay courts. It was the 30th edition of the World Team Cup, and was part of the 250 series of the 2008 ATP Tour. It took place at the Rochusclub in Düsseldorf, Germany, from 18 May through 24 May 2008.

Argentina were the defending champions but they failed to advance beyond the group stage.
Sweden defeated Russia in the final, by two rubbers to one for their fourth title. It was also their first title since 1995.

Blue group

Standings

Germany vs. Spain

Russia vs. Italy

Germany vs. Italy

Spain vs. Russia

Russia vs. Germany

Spain vs. Italy

Red group

Standings

United States vs. Czech Republic

Argentina vs. Sweden

United States vs. Argentina

Czech Republic vs. Sweden

United States vs. Sweden

Argentina vs. Czech Republic

Final

Russia vs. Sweden

References

World Team Cup
Arag World Team Cup, 2008
World Team Cup
May 2008 sports events in Europe
21st century in North Rhine-Westphalia